WJBR-FM (99.5 MHz) – branded Mix 99.5 WJBR – is a commercial adult contemporary radio station licensed to Wilmington, Delaware. Owned by Beasley Broadcast Group, the station serves New Castle County, in addition to Philadelphia, Pennsylvania, and much of the Delaware Valley. The WJBR-FM transmitter is located north of downtown Wilmington on Bellows Drive, near the Pennsylvania state line. Besides a standard analog transmission, WJBR-FM broadcasts over HD Radio, and is available online.

WJBR-HD3 broadcasts a Gospel format branded as Philly's Favor 100.7, which is simulcast on low-power Mount Holly, New Jersey translator W264BH (100.7 FM) and broadcasts to the Philadelphia radio market.

History
On January 31, 1957, the station signed on as a stand-alone FM station, with no AM counterpart.  It was founded by a father and son team, John B. Reynolds, Sr. and John B. Reynolds, Jr. The call sign was based on the founders' initials. John Sr. began the radio station because his son was "a strong believer in the future of FM." The station originally broadcast a classical and light music format.   WJBR-FM's format eventually evolved into beautiful music and the station was branded as JBR 100.  It used the slogan "Just Beautiful Radio."

In 1976, the Reynolds Family acquired another Wilmington radio station, WTUX, to combine with WJBR-FM.  WTUX was a 1,000 watt daytimer, carrying a middle of the road music format. In 1978, WTUX's call sign was switched to WJBR, and the format flipped to beautiful music, to give WJBR listeners the choice of hearing the station on AM or FM. Over time, the station's power was increased to 2,500 watts in the daytime and nighttime service was added at 32 watts.

In the early 1980s, WJBR-AM-FM added more soft vocals to attract a younger audience. John B Reynolds, Jr. sold WJBR-AM-FM in 1985 to CRB Broadcasting, which completed the transition from easy listening to an all-vocal soft adult contemporary sound. CRB changed its name to Commodore Media and was eventually purchased by Capstar Broadcasting.

In March 2000, Capstar sold WJBR-FM to the NextMedia Group for $32.4 million.  Capstar retained WJBR, and later merged into Clear Channel Communications, which was renamed iHeartMedia. The AM station is now a Fox Sports Radio station, WWTX, and remains owned by iHeartMedia.

In February 2007, Beasley Broadcast Group acquired WJBR-FM from NextMedia for a reported $42 million.

Translators
WJBR-HD3 programming is simulcast on the following translator, owned by Spectrum Development Group and operated by JAM Media Group:

References

External links

A Gospel Favor Debuts In Philadelphia
Philly's Favor (99.5 HD3)

JBR-FM
Mainstream adult contemporary radio stations in the United States
Radio stations established in 1957
1957 establishments in Delaware
JBR-FM